Clyde Martin Reed (October 19, 1871 – November 8, 1949) was an American politician from Kansas who served as both the 24th Governor of Kansas and U.S. Senator from that state.

Biography
Born in Champaign County, Illinois, Reed moved to Kansas with his family when he was four years old. After completing a basic education, he taught school for a single year then began work as a federal employee. He served in different capacities for the next thirty years. He first worked for the railroad mail carrier service, rising to be superintendent of several areas throughout the Midwest and then to the Railway Adjustment Division, Post Office Department superintendent. He married Minnie E. Hart in 1891 and they had ten children.

Career
In 1919, Reed became personal secretary to Governor Henry J. Allen in Topeka, who was also owner and publisher of the Wichita Beacon. Four years later, he purchased controlling interest in the Parsons Sun newspaper of Parsons, Kansas, and continued as publisher until his death in 1949. He served on the Kansas Industrial Court from 1920 to 1921, and was a member of the Public Utilities Commission from 1921 to 1924.

Reed was elected Governor of Kansas in 1929, after becoming known as a candidate for being extremely progressive. Shortly after he moved into the governor's mansion, the Great Depression began. Reed called an extra session of the state legislature to combat the troubles faced by Kansans dealing with the depression.

Reed was defeated in his bid for renomination in 1930, and returned to newspaper editing. When the anti-Semitic preacher Gerald B. Winrod ran for the Republican nomination for the United States Senate in 1938 and seemed likely to win it, Reed was recruited by the mainstream political establishment as a popular figure who could prevent Winrod's nomination.  Reed won the nomination and the general election, unseating incumbent Democrat George McGill, and was re-elected in 1944, and served in that office until his death.  While in the Senate, his fellow Kansas Senator was also a former governor, Arthur Capper. Reed attempted to obtain the 1942 Republican nomination for governor of Kansas but failed.

Death
Reed died in 1949 while on a visit home from the Senate. He is interred at Oakwood Cemetery in Parsons.

See also
 List of United States Congress members who died in office (1900–49)

References

External links

Governor's Mansion Bio

 
Parsons Sun.com
National Governors Association
 Publications concerning Kansas Governor Reed's administration available via the KGI Online Library

1871 births
1949 deaths
People from Champaign County, Illinois
Methodists from Kansas
Republican Party United States senators from Kansas
Republican Party governors of Kansas
People from Parsons, Kansas
American newspaper editors
Journalists from Illinois